Garapadu is a village in Vatticherukuru mandal, located in Guntur district of the Indian state of Andhra Pradesh.

References

External links 

 Pictures of Birds at Garapadu

Villages in Guntur district